Cabala (alternately Kabbala(h) or Qabala(h)) may refer to one of several systems of mysticism:
 Kabbalah (קַבָּלָה), a system of Jewish mysticism
 Lurianic Kabbalah, a school of Kabbalah named after Isaac Luria
 Practical Kabbalah, branch of the Jewish mystical tradition that concerns the use of magic
 Prophetic Kabbalah, Abraham Abulafia's system of meditative Kabbalah in Judaism
 Christian Kabbalah, interpreted according to Christian theology
 Hermetic Qabalah, a Western esoteric tradition involving mysticism and the occult
 English Qabalah interprets the letters of the English alphabet via an assigned set of numerological significances
 English Qaballa, an English esoteric and magical tradition

Other traditions with some similarities to Kabbalistic doctrine or methods
 Gnosticism, classical belief systems speculating hierarchical mythic processes of good and evil in divine creation
 Neoplatonism, classical philosophy of descending divine emanationism
 Hurufism, Medieval Sufi Islam sect that combined Koranic letters mystically ("cabalistically")
 Sabbateanism, heretical antinomian adaptions of Kabbalah alongside early-modern Judaism

Places
 Qabala, a city in Azerbaijan
 Qabala District, the wider government region
 Cabala, a variant spelling of Jableh (Gabala), a Christian city in Syria during the Middle Ages

See also
 Cabal, derived from Cabala in European culture, a secret group/intrigue
 Cabalist (disambiguation)
 Hasidic philosophy, theological and mystical teachings of Hasidic Judaism
 Jewish meditation, or Meditative Kabbalah, the meditative tradition within Judaic Kabbalah
 Kabala (disambiguation)
 Kabbala (disambiguation)